Total TV may refer to:

TotalTV, a Serbian television service
Total TV, Inc., a defunct American regional cable television company started by Jim Fitzgerald in 1964 and discontinued in 1998
TV total, a German TV show
Total TV (India), an Indian news channel
Total Television, an American television production company
Zazeen, a Canadian television service rebranded as Total TV in 2020